Cudoniella is a genus of fungi in the family Helotiaceae. The genus contains an estimated 30 species. Cudoniella was circumscribed by mycologist Pier Andrea Saccardo in 1889.

Species

References

Helotiaceae
Helotiales genera